Gerda Schriever (27 August 1928 – 30 May 2014) was a German contralto in oratorio and recital, and an academic teacher. She appeared for decades with the Thomanerchor in Leipzig, also recording and for broadcast. She appeared at international festivals. Schriever was an academic voice teacher at the University of Music and Theatre Leipzig.

Life 
Schriever was born in Leipzig, the daughter of Fritz Schriever who was a teacher at the Thomasschule when Gustav Schreck and Karl Straube were Thomaskantor. She was exposed to the weekly Motette of the Thomanerchor early. She studied voice at the Musikhochschule Leipzig from 1948 to 1953. She appeared already during her studies as a soloist with Diethard Hellmann, in 1951 in Bach's Christmas Oratorio and in 1952 in his St. John Passion. She gave a first Lieder recital in Leipzig when she received the Carl Maria von Weber Prize for Lied interpretation in 1952. In 1953, she was awarded the prize for best German singer at the Geneva International Music Competition.

From 1954 onwards, she was soloist of the Thomanerchor for more than two decades, with Ramin, Kurt Thomas, Erhard Mauersberger and Hans-Joachim Rotzsch. With Mauersberger and the Gewandhausorchester, she performed several Bach cantatas at the Thomaskirche which were broadcast by Radio der DDR. In 1967, she appeared in a broadcast of the Christmas Oratorio, alongside Adele Stolte, Rotzsch and Hermann Christian Polster. With these soloists, she was a member of the Leipzig Bach Soloists from 1968 to 1972.

Schriever also performed with the Dresdner Kreuzchor, conducted by Rudolf Mauersberger and then Martin Flämig, She sang cantatas and oratorios in Germany and abroad and took part in Bach and Handel festivals as well as radio and record recordings. She was also internationally renowned as a lied singer.

Schriever taught singing at the University of Music and Theatre Leipzig. In 1992, she was appointed honorary professor. Among her students was Gotthold Schwarz.

Schriever was married to the pianist Hans-Joachim Drechsel. The couple had three children. She died in Leipzig at the age of 85. The Thomanerchor performed at her funeral.

References

External links 
 
 Gerda Schriever (Mezzo-soprano, Contralto) Bach Cantatas Website
 
 
 Recordings by Gerda Schriever idagio.com
 Stunde der Musik am 22.10.1970 in Heilstätten Zschadraß / Gerda Schriever Alt (concert poster, in German) europeana.eu

German mezzo-sopranos
Academic staff of the University of Music and Theatre Leipzig
1928 births
2014 deaths
Musicians from Leipzig